De agri cultura (On Farming or On Agriculture), written by Cato the Elder, is the oldest surviving work of Latin prose. Alexander Hugh McDonald, in his article for the Oxford Classical Dictionary, dated this essay's composition to about 160 BC and noted that "for all of its lack of form, its details of old custom and superstition, and its archaic tone, it was an up-to-date directed from his own knowledge and experience to the new capitalistic farming." Cato was revered by many later authors for his practical attitudes, his natural stoicism and his tight, lucid prose. He is much quoted by Pliny the Elder, for example, in his Naturalis Historia.

Style

The work of Cato is often characterized as a "farmer's notebook" written in a "random fashion"; it is hard to think of it as literature. The book seems to be no more than a manual of husbandry intended for friends and neighbours. Its direct style, however, was noted by other ancient authors like Aulus Gellius as "forceful and vigorous", in a context of extreme simplicity. Perhaps the main achievement of De agri cultura is its depiction of rural life during the Roman Republic.

Defence of farming

Cato's introduction compares farming with other common activities of that time, specifically commerce and usury. He criticizes both, the former on the basis of the dangers and uncertainty which it bears, the second because according to the Twelve Tables, the usurer is judged a worse criminal than a thief. Cato makes a strong contrast with farming, which he praises as the source of good citizens and soldiers, of both wealth and high moral values.

De agri cultura contains much information on the creation and caring of vineyards, including information on the slaves who helped maintain them. After numerous landowners in Rome read Cato's prose during this time, Rome began to produce wine on a large scale. Many of the new vineyards were sixty acres, and because of their large size, even more slaves were necessary to keep the production of wine running smoothly.

Farm recipes
One section consists of recipes for farm products. These include:
 an imitation of Coan wine (in which sea water was added to the must);
 the first recorded recipe for vinum Graecum, imitating the style of strongly flavoured Greek wine that used to be imported to Roman Italy.
 recipes for savillum, libum and placenta, pastries similar to cheesecake.

Rituals
There is a short section of religious rituals to be performed by farmers. The language of these is clearly traditional, somewhat more archaic than that of the remainder of the text, and has been studied by Calvert Watkins.

Manuscripts
All of the manuscripts of Cato's treatise also include a copy of Varro's essay of the same name. J.G. Schneider and Heinrich Keil showed that the existing manuscripts directly or indirectly descend from a long-lost manuscript called the Marcianus, which was once in the Biblioteca Marciana in Venice and described by Petrus Victorinus as liber antiquissimus et fidelissimus ("a book most ancient and faithful"). The oldest existing manuscript is the Codex Parisinus 6842, written in Italy at some point before the end of the 12th century. The editio princeps was printed at Venice in 1472; Angelo Politian's collation of the Marcianus against his copy of this first printing is considered an important witness for the text.

Texts and translations
Brehaut, E. 1933. Cato the Censor, on Farming. New York: Columbia University Press.

 William Davis Hooper, translator. Marcus Porcius Cato, "On Agriculture"; Marcus Terentius Varro, "On Agriculture". Harvard: Loeb Classical Library, 1934.

See also
Placenta cake

References

Further reading 

K. D. White, "Roman agricultural writers I: Varro and his predecessors" in Aufstieg und Niedergang der römischen Welt ed. H. Temporini. Part 1 vol. 4 (Berlin: De Gruyter, 1973) pp. 439–497.

External links
Latin text and translation
  

Old Latin literature
Geoponici
2nd-century BC Latin books
Works by Cato the Elder
Latin prose texts